Tomazinho Futebol Clube, commonly known as Tomazinho, is a Brazilian football club based in São João de Meriti, Rio de Janeiro state.

History
The club was founded on January 2, 1930, adopting similar colors and team kits as Club de Regatas Vasco da Gama. Tomazinho won the Campeonato Carioca Third Level in 1986, finish ahead of Nova Cidade.

Achievements

 Campeonato Carioca Third Level:
 Winners (1): 1986

Stadium

Tomazinho Futebol Clube play their home games at Estádio Josias José da Silva, nicknamed Beronhão. The stadium has a maximum capacity of 3,000 people.

References

Association football clubs established in 1930
Football clubs in Rio de Janeiro (state)
1930 establishments in Brazil